Laurence Calvert  (16 February 1892 – 6 July 1964) was an English recipient of the Victoria Cross, the highest and most prestigious award for gallantry in the face of the enemy that can be awarded to British and Commonwealth forces.

Calvert was 26 years old, and a sergeant in the 5th Battalion, King's Own Yorkshire Light Infantry, British Army during the First World War when, on 12 September 1918 at Havrincourt, France at the Battle of Havrincourt, the following deed took place for which he was awarded the VC.  The full citation was published in a supplement to the London Gazette of 12 November 1918 (dated 15 November 1918):

He was also awarded the Military Medal (MM), and the Belgian Order of Leopold (with palm), in the grade of Chevalier.

The Medal
His VC is on display in the Lord Ashcroft Gallery at the Imperial War Museum, London.

References

External links
 Location of grave and VC medal (Essex)
 

1892 births
1964 deaths
King's Own Yorkshire Light Infantry soldiers
British Army personnel of World War I
British World War I recipients of the Victoria Cross
Recipients of the Military Medal
British Army recipients of the Victoria Cross
Military personnel from Leeds